ROOT is an object-oriented computer program and library developed by CERN. It was originally designed for particle physics data analysis and contains several features specific to the field, but it is also used in other applications such as astronomy and data mining.  The latest minor release is 6.28, as of 2023-02-03.

Description 
CERN maintained the CERN Program Library written in FORTRAN for many years. Its development and maintenance were discontinued in 2003 in favour of ROOT, which is written in the C++ programming language.
ROOT development was initiated by René Brun and Fons Rademakers in 1994. Some parts are published under the GNU Lesser General Public License (LGPL) and others are based on GNU General Public License (GPL) software, and are thus also published under the terms of the GPL. It provides platform independent access to a computer's graphics subsystem and operating system using abstract layers. Parts of the abstract platform are: a graphical user interface and a GUI builder, container classes, reflection, a C++ script and command line interpreter (CINT in version 5, cling in version 6), object serialization and persistence.

The packages provided by ROOT include those for
 Histogramming and graphing to view and analyze distributions and functions,
 curve fitting (regression analysis) and minimization of functionals,
 statistics tools used for data analysis,
 matrix algebra,
 four-vector computations, as used in high energy physics,
 standard mathematical functions,
 multivariate data analysis, e.g. using neural networks,
 image manipulation, used, for instance, to analyze astronomical pictures,
 access to distributed data (in the context of the Grid),
 distributed computing, to parallelize data analyses,
 persistence and serialization of objects, which can cope with changes in class definitions of persistent data,
 access to databases,
 3D visualizations (geometry),
 creating files in various graphics formats, like PDF, PostScript, PNG, SVG, LaTeX, etc.
 interfacing Python code in both directions,
 interfacing Monte Carlo event generators.

A key feature of ROOT is a data container called tree, with its substructures branches and leaves. A tree can be seen as a sliding window to the raw data, as stored in a file. Data from the next entry in the file can be retrieved by advancing the index in the tree. This avoids memory allocation problems associated with object creation, and allows the tree to act as a lightweight container while handling buffering invisibly.

ROOT is designed for high computing efficiency, as it is required to process data from the Large Hadron Collider's experiments estimated at several petabytes per year.  ROOT is mainly used in data analysis and data acquisition in particle physics (high energy physics) experiments, and most  experimental plots and results in those subfields are obtained using ROOT.

The inclusion of a C++ interpreter (CINT until version 5.34, Cling from version 6.00) makes this package very versatile as it can be used in interactive, scripted and compiled modes in a manner similar to commercial products like MATLAB.

On July 4, 2012 the ATLAS and CMS LHC's experiments presented  the status of the Standard Model Higgs search. All data plotting presented that day used ROOT.

Applications
Several particle physics collaborations have written software based on ROOT, often in favor of using more generic solutions (e.g. using ROOT containers instead of STL).

 Some of the running particle physics experiments using software based on ROOT
 ALICE
 ATLAS
 BaBar experiment
 Belle Experiment (an electron positron collider at KEK (Japan))
 Belle II experiment (successor of the Belle experiment)
 BES III
 CB-ELSA/TAPS
 CMS
 COMPASS experiment (Common Muon and Proton Apparatus for Structure and Spectroscopy)
 CUORE (Cryogenic Underground Observatory for Rare Events)
 D0 experiment
  GlueX Experiment
 GRAPES-3 (Gamma Ray Astronomy PeV EnergieS)
 H1 (particle detector) at HERA collider at DESY, Hamburg
 LHCb
 MINERνA (Main Injector Experiment for ν-A)
 MINOS (Main injector neutrino oscillation search)
 NA61 experiment (SPS Heavy Ion and Neutrino Experiment)
 NOνA
 OPERA experiment
 PHENIX detector
 PHOBOS experiment at Relativistic Heavy Ion Collider
 SNO+
 STAR detector (Solenoidal Tracker at RHIC)
 T2K experiment
 Future particle physics experiments currently developing software based on ROOT
 Mu2e
 Compressed Baryonic Matter experiment (CBM)
 PANDA experiment (antiProton Annihilation at Darmstadt (PANDA))
 Deep Underground Neutrino Experiment (DUNE)
 Hyper-Kamiokande (HK (Japan))
 Astrophysics (X-ray and gamma-ray astronomy, astroparticle physics) projects using ROOT
AGILE
 Alpha Magnetic Spectrometer (AMS)
 Antarctic Impulse Transient Antenna (ANITA)
 ANTARES neutrino detector
 CRESST (Dark Matter Search)
 DMTPC
 DEAP-3600/Cryogenic Low-Energy Astrophysics with Neon(CLEAN)
 Fermi Gamma-ray Space Telescope
 ICECUBE
 HAWC
 High Energy Stereoscopic System (H.E.S.S.)
 Hitomi (ASTRO-H)
 MAGIC
 Milagro
 Pierre Auger Observatory
 VERITAS
 PAMELA
 POLAR
 PoGOLite
 Computational Neuroscience projects using ROOT
 The MIIND Project Home Page

Criticisms 
Criticisms of ROOT include its difficulty for beginners, as well as various aspects of its design and implementation. Frequent causes of frustration include extreme code bloat, heavy use of global variables, and an overcomplicated class hierarchy. From time to time these issues are discussed on the ROOT users mailing list. While scientists dissatisfied with ROOT have in the past managed to work around its flaws, some of the shortcomings are regularly addressed by the ROOT team. The CINT interpreter, for example, has been replaced by the Cling interpreter, and numerous bugs are fixed with every release.

See also 

 Matplotlib – a plotting and analysis system for Python
 SciPy – a scientific data analysis system for Python, based on the NumPy classes
 Perl Data Language – a set of array programming extensions to the Perl programming language
 HippoDraw – an alternative C++-based data analysis system
 Java Analysis Studio – a Java-based AIDA-compliant data analysis system
 R programming language
 AIDA (computing) – open interfaces and formats for particle physics data processing
 Geant4 – a platform for the simulation of the passage of particles through matter using Monte Carlo methods
 PAW
 IGOR Pro
 Scientific Linux
 Scientific computing
 OpenDX
 OpenScientist
 CERN Program Library – legacy program library written in Fortran77, still available but not updated

References

External links 

 The ROOT System Home Page
 Image galleries
 ROOT User's Guide
 ROOT Reference Guide
 ROOT Forum
 The RooFit Toolkit for Data Modeling, an extension to ROOT to facilitate maximum likelihood fits
 The Toolkit for Multivariate Data Analysis with ROOT (TMVA) is a ROOT-integrated project providing a machine learning environment for the processing and evaluation of multivariate classification, both binary and multi class, and regression techniques targeting applications in high-energy physics (here or here).

C++ libraries
Data analysis software
Data management software
Experimental particle physics
Free physics software
Free plotting software
Free science software
Free software programmed in C++
Numerical software
Physics software
Plotting software
CERN software